Michael Laxer (born 1970) is a Canadian political activist and the former chairperson of the Socialist Party of Ontario.

Background
Laxer lives in the Toronto neighbourhood of Long Branch, in Etobicoke, where he and his wife own and operate a used book store, the only independent used bookstore in south Etobicoke until it closed its bricks and mortar operation at the end of 2015, becoming an online bookstore. He is the son of writer, political scientist, professor, and former NDP leadership candidate James Laxer and grandson of Robert Laxer.

Politics
He was a candidate for the New Democratic Party (NDP) in the 2000 federal election in the riding of Scarborough—Agincourt, and for the Ontario NDP during the 2003 provincial election in Scarborough Centre.
Laxer was also an unsuccessful candidate for Toronto City Council in Ward 6 (Etobicoke-Lakeshore) in the 2010 municipal election.

In 2008, he criticized the $15,000 entrance fee for the Ontario NDP leadership election as being too high saying, "What you get by doing that is you manifestly limit the number of people who are outside the party establishment, and who have available big backers of one kind or another."

Laxer subsequently began the Ginger Project calling for the Ontario NDP (ONDP) to issue a comprehensive manifesto of policies and build support for their ideas rather than put all their resources into winning marginal ridings. In an open letter to ONDP leader Andrea Horwath, Laxer wrote:

He and the Ginger Project left the NDP in 2011 due to its cancellation of a policy convention and what they viewed as the silencing of left-wingers telling the Toronto Star, "I was surprised that they would not have a policy convention prior to an election." Laxer was one of two official spokespersons of the Socialist Party of Ontario from 2011 to 2012 and was the party's chairperson.

In 2010 and 2014 Laxer ran for City Councillor in Toronto's Ward 6 Etobicoke—Lakeshore receiving 717 votes in his first effort and 305 in his second.

Laxer is a social activist who opposes men's rights groups because he believes men's rights movement is a vocal opponent of feminism. In 2015, he told the Toronto Star he had been encouraging people to fight the Canadian Association for Equality's inclusion at the LGBT Pride parade, because he believed allowing men’s rights groups to walk would "legitimize them and mainstream misogyny".

Election results

In popular culture

Video games 

In the Hearts of Iron 4 mod, Red World , Michael Laxer is a potential far-left Cabinet minister for Canada. As a "Second in Command" advisor, he takes a role akin to those of a head of government in socialist nations.

References

External links
Michael Laxer's Ward 6 City Councillor 2014 election website
The Left Chapter Michael Laxer's blog
Michael Laxer's Blog at rabble.ca

1970 births
21st-century Canadian businesspeople
21st-century Canadian politicians
Activists from Toronto
Businesspeople from Toronto
Canadian activists
Canadian booksellers
Canadian socialists
Candidates in the 2000 Canadian federal election
Living people
Ontario municipal politicians
Ontario New Democratic Party candidates in Ontario provincial elections
Ontario political party leaders
People from Etobicoke
Politicians from Toronto